The Confederation of Labour of Russia (KTR) is a national trade union center in Russia. It was founded on 12 April 1995 and is affiliated with the International Trade Union Confederation.

References

External links
 KTR official site

International Trade Union Confederation
National trade union centers of Russia
Trade unions established in 1995